Anatole "Tola" Vologe (25 May 1909 in Vilnius – 24 May 1944 in Lyon) was a French field hockey player who competed in the 1936 Summer Olympics. He was a member of the French field hockey team, which finish fourth in the 1936 Olympic tournament. He played all five matches as forward.

He was born in Vilnius, Lithuania (but then in the Russian Empire) in 1909.

He was executed during World War II at Lyon, allegedly for attempting escape after being arrested by Milice and imprisoned by the Germans.

References

External links
 
profile
Article on his death (Quoted from L'Equipe) 

1909 births
1944 deaths
French male field hockey players
Olympic field hockey players of France
Field hockey players at the 1936 Summer Olympics
French people executed by Nazi Germany
French civilians killed in World War II